Carex vicinalis is a species of sedge that was first described by Francis Boott in 1867. It is native to southern India. The type specimen was collected at the Nilghiri Hills.

References

vicinalis
Flora of India
Plants described in 1867